Pearl River Mart is an Asian-American retail brand and family-run business in New York City. The business was founded in 1971 in Chinatown, Manhattan, as Chinese Native Products by Ming Yi Chen and a group of student activists from China, Hong Kong, and Taiwan. Chen has said that she and her colleagues "wanted to create a small window into the Chinese culture". Its products include braided straw slippers, paper lanterns, cheongsams, cotton Mary Janes, and copies of Mao's Little Red Book. Pearl River Mart has become a New York City institution. The business has an art gallery in its main location, and hosts in-store events and performances.

History
Pearl River Mart was founded in 1971 by Ming Yi Chen and a group of activists from China, Hong Kong, and Taiwan. Diplomatic relations between the United States and China were frozen at the time, and trade was banned due to the Cold War. The founders hoped that the store would improve cultural understanding of China. When trade relations were restored, Pearl River Mart was an early recipient of Chinese goods. The store has occupied various locations since its founding, including a  location described as a "department store".

In March 2016, Pearl River Mart closed due to increasing rent. It re-opened in November 2016 under the leadership of Joanne Kwong, the Chens' daughter-in-law, who graduated from Columbia University and worked as an attorney, a professor at Fordham University School of Law, and VP of communications at Barnard College. In November 2017, the store expanded with a second location in Chelsea Market; a third location opened at the Museum of Chinese in America in January 2019.

Pearl River Mart has collaborated with several Asian-American designers and entrepreneurs. It also has an art gallery, which showcases the work of Asian and Asian-American artists; featured artists have included Corky Lee, Chinatown Art Brigade, and Yumi Sakugawa. Artists Space and the Smithsonian Asian Pacific American Center have been guest curators.

See also 
 Chinese in New York City
 List of museums and cultural institutions in New York City

References

External links 
 

1971 establishments in New York City
Broadway (Manhattan)
Retail companies based in New York City